WTIP is a Community-based Public Radio formatted broadcast radio station licensed to Grand Marais, Minnesota, serving Cook County, Minnesota.  WTIP is owned and operated by Cook County Community Radio Corporation.

Full Power Translators
In addition to the main station, WTIP is relayed by two full power translators to widen its broadcast area and cover all of Cook County, Minnesota.

See also
List of community radio stations in the United States

References

External links
 North Shore Community Radio Online
 

1998 establishments in Minnesota
Community radio stations in the United States
Public radio stations in the United States
Radio stations established in 1998
Radio stations in Minnesota
Grand Marais, Minnesota